Charles Bryant (8 January 1879 – 7 August 1948) was a British actor and film director.

Life
Bryant was born in Hartford, Cheshire, on 8 January 1879. He was educated at Ardingly College in Sussex. He left school at the age of 14 to become a stage actor, and three years later, traveled to the United States to begin working on Broadway, starring in The First Born in 1897.

Bryant starred in A Train of Incidents (1914) and War Brides (1916), which was the first film of his wife Alla Nazimova. Bryant and Nazimova signed with Metro Pictures in 1918 and starred alongside each other in a number of films including Revelation, Out of the Fog, and Billions. In 1918, Nazimova founded Nazimova Productions, and it was there that Bryant began directing, with the pair creating a film adaptation of Oscar Wilde’s play Salome in 1923. Bryant and Nazimova's pairing was short-lived. Salomé was notably too far ahead of its time and failed at the box office, bankrupting Nazimova Productions. Bryant never worked in film again, instead returning to Broadway. He divorced Nazimova shortly after leaving Hollywood, their marriage apparently having been only one of convenience and no longer necessary.

Marriages and children

He claimed to have married Alla Nazimova on 5 December 1912 but the marriage never was consummated.

On 16 November 1925, Bryant, 43, surprised the press, Nazimova and Nazimova's fans by marrying Marjorie Gilhooley, 23, in Connecticut. When the press uncovered the fact that Charles had listed his current marital status as "single" on his marriage licence, the revelation that the marriage between Alla and Charles had been a sham from the beginning embroiled Nazimova in a scandal that damaged her career. Charles and Marjorie divorced in 1936.

Bryant had two children with Gilhooley, Charles Bryant Jr. and Sheila Bryant. On 8 June 1948, Sheila married the American novelist Richard Yates.

Death
Bryant died on 7 August 1948 in Mount Kisco, New York at age 69.

Partial filmography
Eye for Eye (1918)
Revelation (1918)
The Red Lantern (1919)
The Brat (1919)
Stronger Than Death (1920)
The Heart of a Child (1920)
Billions (1920)
A Doll's House (1922) (directed)
Salomé (1923) (directed)

References

External links

 
 
 

1879 births
1948 deaths
People educated at Ardingly College
English male film actors
English male silent film actors
English male stage actors
People from Hartford, Cheshire
20th-century English male actors
British expatriate male actors in the United States